St Margaret's College may refer to:

 St Margaret's College, Christchurch, girls' secondary school, New Zealand
 St Margaret's College, Otago, hall of residence of the University of Otago, New Zealand
 St. Margaret's Junior College, Tokyo, Japan

See also 
 St Margaret's School (disambiguation)